Funkenburg is a mountain in the Lusatian Highlands in the Bautzen district of Saxony, southeastern Germany. It is near the border to the Czech republic.

Mountains of Saxony